Antonia Prado is a Mexican former tennis player active in the 1960s.

Prado, the women's singles champion at the 1962 Central American and Caribbean Games, represented Mexico at the 1963 Pan American Games in São Paulo. She fell in the quarter-finals to Maria Bueno, but made it as far as the bronze medal play-off in the women's doubles event.

In 1964 she made her only appearance with the Mexico Federation Cup team, for a World Group 1st round tie against Czechoslovakia in Philadelphia. She lost her singles match to Jitka Horčičková and was also beaten in the doubles, while partnering Patricia Reyes.

References

External links
 
 

Year of birth missing (living people)
Living people
Mexican female tennis players
Competitors at the 1962 Central American and Caribbean Games
Central American and Caribbean Games medalists in tennis
Central American and Caribbean Games gold medalists for Mexico
Central American and Caribbean Games silver medalists for Mexico
Tennis players at the 1963 Pan American Games
Pan American Games competitors for Mexico
20th-century Mexican women